Basil Konstantine Poledouris (August 21, 1945 – November 8, 2006) was an American composer, conductor, and orchestrator of film and television scores, best known for his long-running collaborations with directors John Milius and Paul Verhoeven. Among his works are scores for the films Conan the Barbarian (1982), Red Dawn (1984), Iron Eagle (1986), RoboCop (1987), The Hunt for Red October (1990), Free Willy (1993), Starship Troopers (1997) and Les Misérables (1998). Poledouris won the Primetime Emmy Award for Outstanding Music Composition for a Limited Series, Movie, or Special for his work on the four-part miniseries Lonesome Dove in 1989, and was a four-time recipient of the BMI Film Music Award.

Life and career
Born in Kansas City, Missouri, to Greek immigrant parents from Messenia, he credited two influences with guiding him towards music: the first was composer Miklós Rózsa; the second his own Greek Orthodox heritage. Poledouris was raised in the Church, and he used to sit in services enthralled by the choir's sound. At the age of seven, Poledouris began piano lessons, and after graduation from Garden Grove High School, he enrolled at the University of Southern California to study both filmmaking and music. Several short films to which he contributed are still kept in the university's archives. At USC, Poledouris met movie directors John Milius and Randal Kleiser, with whom he would later collaborate as a music composer. He appeared as a background extra in several episodes of Star Trek: The Original Series. In 1985, Poledouris wrote the music for Paul Verhoeven's Flesh & Blood, establishing a durable collaboration.

Poledouris became renowned for his powerfully epic style of orchestral composition and his intricate thematic designs. He scored the soundtrack for The Blue Lagoon (1980; dir: Kleiser); Conan the Barbarian (1982; dir: Milius); Conan the Destroyer (1984); Red Dawn (1984; dir: Milius), Iron Eagle (1986); RoboCop (1987; dir: Verhoeven); The Hunt for Red October (1990); Quigley Down Under (1990 Simon Wincer); Free Willy (1993) and its first sequel Free Willy 2: The Adventure Home (1995); Starship Troopers (1997; dir: Verhoeven); and For Love of the Game (1999).

Poledouris' studio, "Blowtorch Flats", was located in Venice, California, and was a professional mixing facility specializing in film and media production.

Poledouris married his wife Bobbie in 1969; they had two daughters, Zoë and Alexis. His elder daughter, Zoë Poledouris, is an actress and film composer, who occasionally collaborated with her father in composing film soundtracks.

In 1996, Poledouris composed "The Tradition of the Games" for the Atlanta Olympics opening ceremony that accompanied the memorable dance tribute to the athletes and goddesses of victory of the ancient Greek Olympics using silhouette imagery.

Poledouris spent the last four years of his life residing on Vashon Island, in Washington state. He died on November 8, 2006, in Los Angeles, California, aged 61, from lung cancer.

Awards and nominations
Winner Best Score for Miniseries – Emmy Awards (Lonesome Dove)
Nominee Best Score – Saturn Awards (Conan the Barbarian)
Winner Special Recognition Music Award – BMI Film & TV Awards (Olympic Tribute for "The Tradition of the Games")
Winner Film Music Award – BMI Awards (Free Willy)
Winner Film Music Award – BMI Awards (The Hunt for Red October)
Winner TV Music Award – BMI Awards (Lonesome Dove)
Winner Film Music Award – BMI Awards (RoboCop)

Filmography

Films

Television

Other works
 1996 Atlanta Olympic Games (Opening Ceremony)
 Conan Sword & Sorcery Spectacular (Universal Studios' live stage show)
 American Journeys (A Circle-Vision 360° film at Disneyland and Magic Kingdom)
 Flyers (IMAX, 1982)
 Behold Hawaii (IMAX, 1983)

References

External links
 
 
 Basil Poledouris interview at UnderScores : Musique de Film

1945 births
2006 deaths
20th-century American composers
20th-century American conductors (music)
20th-century classical composers
American classical composers
American film score composers
American male classical composers
American male conductors (music)
American people of Greek descent
American television composers
California State University, Long Beach alumni
Deaths from lung cancer in California
Greek Orthodox Christians from the United States
American male film score composers
Male television composers
Musicians from Kansas City, Missouri
Musicians from Los Angeles
USC Thornton School of Music alumni
Varèse Sarabande Records artists
20th-century American male musicians